"(Love Is) The Tender Trap" is a popular song composed by Jimmy Van Heusen, with lyrics by Sammy Cahn.

It was written for the 1955 film The Tender Trap, where it was introduced by Debbie Reynolds and Frank Sinatra, who each sing the song separately. It was nominated for the Academy Award for Best Original Song, but lost to "Love Is a Many-Splendored Thing" from the film of the same name.

A version by Frank Sinatra became a major hit in the United Kingdom, peaking at no. 2 in February 1956. It reached no. 7 in the US charts.

Other recordings
Bing Crosby recorded the song in 1955 for use on his radio show and it was subsequently included in the box set The Bing Crosby CBS Radio Recordings (1954-56) issued by Mosaic Records (catalog MD7-245) in 2009. 
Debbie Reynolds (1956).
Denny Dennis (1956).
Ella Fitzgerald (1956).
Frank Sinatra recorded it again in 1962 for his album Sinatra–Basie: An Historic Musical First.
Sammy Davis Jr. - for his album The Wham of Sam (1961)
Robert Palmer - from the album Robert Palmer (1992), which was also used on the soundtrack of the film True Romance. 
Stacey Kent - included in her album Love Is...The Tender Trap (1998)
Steve Lawrence - for his album Academy Award Losers (1964).

References

1955 singles
1955 songs
1950s ballads 
Debbie Reynolds songs
Frank Sinatra songs
Songs written for films
Songs with music by Jimmy Van Heusen
Songs with lyrics by Sammy Cahn